The Christian Democratic Movement (KDH) is a Christian-democratic political party in Slovakia that is a member of the European People's Party (EPP) and an observer of the Centrist Democrat International.

History

The party was established in 1990. In the 1990s it was led by Ján Čarnogurský and then since 2000 by Pavol Hrušovský. Before the 2016 elections, it was led by Ján Figeľ. Following the defeat in the elections, Figeľ stepped down from the position and Pavol Zajac became temporary leader until the decisive party meeting on 19 March 2016. Figeľ endorsed Milan Majerský, mayor of Levoča, for the position.

The KDH was a member of the government coalition, but it left that coalition on 7 February 2006 due to disputes over an international treaty between Slovakia and the Holy See dealing with the Conscientious objection on religious grounds.

In the parliamentary election of 17 June 2006, the party won 8.3% of the popular vote and 14 out of 150 seats.

Four prominent parliamentary members (František Mikloško, Vladimír Palko, Rudolf Bauer and Pavol Minárik) left the party on 21 February 2008 due to their dissatisfaction with the party, its leadership and its policies, and founded the Conservative Democrats of Slovakia in July.

In the 2012 parliamentary election, KDH received 8.82% of the vote, placing it the second-largest party in the National Council with 16 deputies, leaving it the largest opposition party to the ruling Direction – Social Democracy.

In the 2014 European elections, KDH came second place nationally, receiving 13.21% of the vote and electing 2 MEPs.

In the 2016 parliamentary election, the party only won 4.94% of the vote, losing all of its seats. This was the first time since its inception that the party did not reach the parliament. Following the electoral defeat, KDH elected Alojz Hlina its new leader.

Party leaders 

 Pavol Zajac was acting president of party in 2016 and 2020 (after the lost election)

Election results

National Council

European Parliament

Presidential

See also
Politics of Slovakia
List of political parties in Slovakia
Slovak Democratic and Christian Union – Democratic Party

Notes

References

External links
  

 
Conservative parties in Slovakia
Christian democratic parties in Slovakia
Member parties of the European People's Party
Social conservative parties
Catholic political parties